The black tree cobra (Pseudohaje nigra) is a species of venomous tree cobra found in central and western Africa. This species is one of the two tree cobras in Africa, the other being Goldie's tree cobra (Pseudohaje goldii).

Distribution and habitat
P. nigra is found in Ghana, Guinea, Ivory Coast, Liberia, Nigeria, Sierra Leone, and Togo.

Description
P. nigra is black dorsally, and brown ventrally.

References

Further reading
Günther A. 1858. Catalogue of the Colubrine Snakes in the Collection of the British Museum. London: Trustees of the British Museum. (Taylor and Francis, printers). xvi + 281 pp. (Pseudohaje nigra, new species, p. 222).

Pseudohaje
Reptiles of Africa
Taxa named by Albert Günther
Reptiles described in 1858